The 1960 United States presidential election in California took place on November 8, 1960 as part of the 1960 United States presidential election. State voters chose 32 representatives, or electors, to the Electoral College, who voted for president and vice president.

California voted for the Republican nominee, Vice President Richard Nixon, over the Democratic nominee, Massachusetts Senator John F. Kennedy. Although California was Nixon's home state, which he represented in the House and Senate, and initial political base, his margin of victory over Kennedy turned out to be extremely narrow; in fact, it was the closest of the states that Nixon won and the fourth closest state in the election after Hawaii, Illinois and Missouri. On the morning of November 9, the NBC victory desk erroneously projected California to Kennedy.

Nixon would later win California again against Hubert Humphrey in 1968 and then against George McGovern in 1972.

Primaries

Democratic primary

Running unopposed, California governor Pat Brown won the state's Democratic primary as a favorite son.

While the primary itself was straightforward, the developments surrounding the primary were far more complex.

Kennedy had not come easily to his decision not to compete in the California primary, and had at one point tentatively filed to run in the primary.

Kennedy had begun to contemplate the state's primary at an early stage in the development of his campaign.

By early 1958 Kennedy's team had recognized the state to be a Democratic target for the midterm elections, since economic woes had weakened the Republican Party's strength in the state. This meant that the 1958 midterm election would serve to gauge the prospect of Democrats winning the state in the 1960 presidential election. In February 1958, Ted Sorensen spent $1,500 in order to commission a survey in California that would be conducted that March, coinciding with a two-day visit by Kennedy to the state. The survey showed Kennedy winning 55 to 45% in a then-hypothetical general election race against Nixon. The survey also demonstrated Kennedy to have a strong lead in California among Catholics, who constituted one-fifth of the state's populace.

Kennedy, however, remained undecided as to whether or not he would compete in the state's primary.

In November 1958, the midterm elections delivered encouraging signs for Democratic prospects of carrying the state in 1960. Pat Brown had defeated the Nixon-backed Republican candidate,  outgoing U.S. Senate Minority Leader William Knowland, in the state's gubernatorial election and Democrat Clair Engle defeated the Nixon-backed Republican candidate, outgoing governor Goodwin Knight, in the race for the U.S. Senate seat being vacated by Knowland.

California was one of several large state delegations to the Democratic National convention whose support the Kennedy campaign  came to believe was integral when they mapped-out his path to secure the nomination.

The Kennedy campaign was concerned that Brown might run against Kennedy as a favorite son in the primary. Brown saw himself as a potential running mate on the Democratic ticket. However, he recognized that his chances of being selected would disappear if Kennedy were the presidential nominee, as Brown and Kennedy were both Catholics and a ticket composed of two Catholics was improbable. Thus. Brown recognized that he would need for Kennedy to lose the nomination if he were to stand a chance at securing the vice-presidential nomination for himself.

California's Democratic Party landscape at the time, stood largely divided between Brown loyalists and Adlai Stevenson supporters (many of whom had hopes of nominating Stevenson a third consecutive time).

Kennedy's campaign began to consider the possibility of pursuing a compromise with Brown in which he would run as a favorite candidate committed to Kennedy. Such a compromise would have granted Brown the profile and ego boost of winning the state's primary. It would have allowed Kennedy to eschew a scenario in which he could underperform or be defeated in one of the last primaries, which would weaken the momentum he needed to have heading into the convention. It would also have avoided the risk of dividing the state party, which was important since a divided state party would have decimated any chance Kennedy stood of carrying the state in the general election. At the same time, such a compromise would still have secured the support of California's delegation for Kennedy. Kennedy's campaign decided that, so long as their candidate still had momentum from having won primaries in other key states, there would be no problem in having Brown run as a surrogate candidate in California. To help persuade Brown to be inclined towards such an agreement, Larry O'Brien met with Brown on behalf of the campaign and showed him polling that Louis Harris had conducted for them which showed Kennedy winning the state 60% to 40% in a two-way race against Brown and was also beating him in a three-way matchup featuring Humphrey, polling 47% against Brown's 33% and Humphrey's 20%. The campaign ultimately reached an informal agreement with Brown to have him run, pledged to Kennedy, as a favorite son.

Despite their informal agreement with Brown, Kennedy's campaign continued to possess worries about the state's primary. They were uncertain as to what degree Brown was intent on honoring their agreement. They also recognized that there was a potential that Stevenson might run in the state's primary. Another concern involved the candidacy of Hubert Humphrey. Kennedy's team believed that there was a possibility that Humphrey might file to run in the state. While Kennedy's campaign strategy aimed to have killed Humphrey's candidacy well in advance of the California primary by dealing him critical defeats in earlier primaries, they were still somewhat concerned about a potential scenario in which Kennedy would have failed to knock Humphrey out of the race and Humphrey ran in the California primary. They were worried that, in such an instance,  Brown might prove to be a much less effective an opponent to Humphrey than Kennedy himself would be.

To precautionarily leave open the campaign's options, on the March 9 deadline to file for the primary, Kennedy filed his own slate of prospective delegates which would be, at least tentatively, registered to run against Brown's slate. Humphrey filed a slate of his own later that day. This blindsided Brown, who believed that he had secured promises from both candidates that neither of them would run against him in the California primary.

By the time of the California primary, Humphrey had already ended his campaign. Since he had only filed as a precaution for the possibility of Humphrey competing in California, Kennedy attempted to make peace. Kennedy withdrew, granting Brown the opportunity to run unopposed.

Feeling betrayed by Kennedy, Brown did not publicly endorse him, much to the chagrin of the Kennedy campaign. Brown, ultimately, held weak control over a fractious state delegation, whose ranks included a number of Stevenson loyalists, and Stevenson had left open the possibility of being drafted as a candidate at the convention. After failing to secure a public endorsement from Brown ahead of the convention, Kennedy and his team ultimately resorted to courting individual members of its delegation for their support.

Republican primary

Nixon won California's Republican primary, in which he was unopposed.

General election
Hand counting of ballots in Los Angeles County delayed certification of results. This lead Secretary of State Frank M Jordan to champion legislation mandating that counties use voting machines. Although he was a California native, Richard Nixon won California by an incredibly narrow margin, throwing the official election outcome into uncertainty for a number of weeks, although Nixon conceded the next day.

Results

Results by county

References

California
1960
1960 California elections